One Desire is a 1955 Technicolor drama romance film directed by Jerry Hopper and starring Anne Baxter, Julie Adams and Rock Hudson. Described as a "rugged story of oil-boom Oklahoma in the early 1900s", it was adapted from Conrad Richter's best-selling 1942 novel Tacey Cromwell.  Baxter portrays a gambling house owner, Hudson a card dealer turned bank president and Adams the woman who comes between them. A young Natalie Wood is also in a featured role.

Although the music is generally by Frank Skinner, the film features a Henry Mancini song sung by Gene Boyd and backed by the Glenn Miller Orchestra which was uncredited to Mancini.

Plot
Clint Saunders is dismissed from his job as the White Palace saloon's card dealer after coming to work late. He doesn't mind, wishing to leave for Colorado and the lucrative silver mines there. Saloon owner Tacey Cromwell, in love with Clint, decides to leave with him and Clint's little brother Nugget, even though Clint doesn't wish to settle down.

In their new town, Clint becomes acquainted with prosperous Judith Watrous, a senator's daughter, who offers him a job running her bank and is obviously attracted to him. Tacey does her best to make a proper home for Nugget and for a young tomboy, Seely Dowder, taking in the girl when she becomes an orphan.

The haughty Judith learns of Tacey's past life, after having hired a private investigator and jealously has custody of the children taken from Tacey while Clint is out of town. A broken-hearted Tacey returns to her old saloon job, while Clint remains behind and marries Judith. As years go by, Seely grows up and encounters Tacey again. They return to Colorado, where upon discovering how Judith betrayed her, Tacey plans to open a rowdy new saloon, right across the street from  the Judith/Clint home out of spite.

During a quarrel, a drunken Judith throws a lantern at Clint and sets their house ablaze. ( note they live in the "Herman Munster" house and ride by the "Beaver Cleaver" house too). She perishes in the fire. Tacey's saloon catches fire as well and burns to the ground. Tacey, the children and Clint vow to carry on and rebuild their lives.

Cast
 Anne Baxter as Tacey Cromwell
 Rock Hudson as Clint Saunders
 Barry Curtis as Nugget Saunders
 Julie Adams as Judith Watrous
 Carl Benton Reid as Sen. Kenneth A. Watrous
 Natalie Wood as Seely Dowder
 Betty Garde as Mrs. O'Dell
 William Hopper as MacBain

Reception
The Ames Daily Tribune praised the "exciting climax" of the film with a drunken quarrel and fire, and praised the "ace high" of the cast in their "demanding" roles. The New York Times described it as "nothing thing more than a plodding, old-fashioned soap opera" triangle and that "some spectators may find themselves simply tuning in, eyes closed, to the familiar train of events, dialogue and musical effects", although praised the performances of the cast. One book described it as "another 50s melodrama made at Universal".

See also
List of American films of 1955

References

External links
 

1955 films
1955 romantic drama films
American romantic drama films
Films based on American novels
Films directed by Jerry Hopper
Films produced by Ross Hunter
Films set in Oklahoma
Films set in the 1900s
Universal Pictures films
Films scored by Frank Skinner
1950s English-language films
1950s American films